LFR can refer to:

 Lay First Responder (LFR) International, emergency medical service in Africa
 Leavine Family Racing
 Lincolnshire Fire and Rescue, England
 Louisville Division of Fire, US